A list of films produced in Finland ordered by year of release. For an alphabetical list of Finnish films see :Category:Finnish films

 List of Finnish films before 1917
 List of Finnish films of 1917–39
 List of Finnish films of the 1940s
 List of Finnish films of the 1950s
 List of Finnish films of the 1960s
 List of Finnish films of the 1970s
 List of Finnish films of the 1980s
 List of Finnish films of the 1990s
 List of Finnish films of the 2000s
 List of Finnish films of the 2010s
 List of Finnish films of the 2020s

External links
 Finnish film at the Internet Movie Database